The Paso doble competition at the 2010 Asian Games in Guangzhou was held on 14 November at the Zengcheng Gymnasium.

Schedule
All times are China Standard Time (UTC+08:00)

Results

Quarterfinal

Semifinal

Final

References 

 Results
 Report of the Final Round

Dancesport at the 2010 Asian Games